Petra Dortmund (born 26 May 1959, Menden, Germany), is a retired German athlete who competes in compound archery. Her achievements include a gold medal at the 2002 European Grand Prix, and becoming the world number one ranked archer in February 2003.

References

1959 births
Living people
German female archers
World Archery Championships medalists
21st-century German women